is a Filipino actress who is based in Japan. She is represented by Inagawa Motoko Office.  She appeared in various films and television shows in Japan as well as in a number of Philippine films.

She won several acting awards including the award for best actress at the 18th Hochi Film Award and the award for best supporting actress at the 15th Yokohama Film Festival for All Under the Moon.

Selected filmography
Swimming with Tears (1992)
All Under the Moon (1993)
Shinjuku Outlaw (1994)
Dead Sure (1996, Tagalog title: Segurista)
Love Tomato (2006)
No Place to Go (2022), Maria Ishikawa

References

External links

1965 births
Filipino expatriates in Japan
Filipino film actresses
Living people